Arvydas Gronskis (born 17 May 1974) is a Lithuanian professional basketball coach, most notable for his successful long-term working in Lietuvos rytas Vilnius coaching staff. He is currently the head coach of Žalgiris-2 Kaunas.

References

1974 births
Living people
Lithuanian basketball coaches
BC Rytas coaches
Basketball players from Vilnius